L'Église de la Visitation de la Bienheureuse-Vierge-Marie is a church in the neighbourhood of Recollet Falls in Montreal. The oldest church on the island of Montreal, it was built between 1749 and 1752.

Gallery

External links  
 Fiche de L'église de la Visitation de la Bienheureuse-Vierge-Marie de la Fondation du patrimoine religieux du Québec

La Visitation-de-la-Bienheureuse-Vierge-Marie
18th-century Roman Catholic church buildings in Canada
La
Landmarks in Montreal
French colonial architecture in Canada
Ahuntsic-Cartierville
Heritage buildings of Quebec